The Satellite Award for Best Actor in a Supporting Role in a Series – Drama and Musical/Comedy were two awards given in 2003 and 2004.

Winners and nominees

2000s

Television Series – Drama

2003: Victor Garber – Alias
 Dennis Haysbert – 24
 Anthony Heald – Boston Public
 James Marsters – Buffy the Vampire Slayer
 Ron Rifkin – Alias

2004: Neal McDonough – Boomtown
 Andy Hallett – Angel
 Hill Harper – The Handler
 Anthony Heald – Boston Public
 Michael Rosenbaum – Smallville
 Gregory Smith – Everwood

Television Series – Musical or Comedy

2003: Eric Roberts – Less Than Perfect
 Sean Hayes – Will & Grace
 Peter MacNicol – Ally McBeal
 Chris Noth – Sex and the City
 David Hyde Pierce – Frasier

2004: Jeffrey Tambor – Arrested Development
 David Cross – Arrested Development
 David Alan Grier – Life with Bonnie
 Sean Hayes – Will & Grace
 Matt LeBlanc – Friends
 David Hyde Pierce – Frasier

References

Actor - Television Series, Supporting
Television awards for Best Supporting Actor

fr:Satellite Award - Anciennes récompenses - Télévision